The 1975 USC Trojans football team represented the University of Southern California (USC) in the 1975 NCAA Division I football season. In their 15th year under head coach John McKay, the Trojans compiled an 8–4 record (3–4 against conference opponents), finished in fifth place in the Pacific-8 Conference (Pac-8), and outscored their opponents by a combined total of 247 to 140. The team was ranked #17 in the final AP Poll and #19 in the final UPI Coaches Poll.

Quarterback Vince Evans led the team in passing, completing 35 of 112 passes for 695 yards with three touchdowns and nine interceptions.  Ricky Bell led the team in rushing with 385 carries for 1,957 yards and 13 touchdowns. Randy Simmrin led the team in receiving with 26 catches for 478 yards and one touchdown.

Schedule

Roster

Game summaries

Duke
Ricky Bell 34 rushes, 256 yards

Oregon State

Purdue
Ricky Bell 89 rush yards

at Iowa

Washington State

    
    
    
    
    
    

Ricky Bell 38 Rush, 217 Yds

at Notre Dame

1975 team players in the NFL
The following players were drafted into professional football following the season.

References

USC
USC Trojans football seasons
Liberty Bowl champion seasons
USC Trojans football